Clarence W. Barron (July 2, 1855, in Boston, Massachusetts – October 2, 1928) was one of the most influential figures in the history of Dow Jones & Company.  As a career newsman described as a "short, rotund powerhouse",  he died holding the posts of president of Dow Jones and de facto manager of The Wall Street Journal.  He is considered the founder of modern financial journalism.

Early life 
Barron graduated from Boston English high school in 1873.

Career
Barron worked at a number of newspapers throughout his life, including the Boston Daily News and the Boston Evening Transcript, the latter from 1875 to 1887.  He founded the Boston News Bureau in 1887 and the Philadelphia News Bureau in 1897, supplying financial news to brokers.

In March 1903, Barron purchased Dow Jones & Company for $130,000, following the death of co-founder Charles Dow.  In 1912, he appointed himself president, a title he held until his death and one which allowed him control of The Wall Street Journal, while the Woodworths published the paper. He expanded the reach of his publishing empire by merging his two news bureaus into Dow Jones.  By 1920, he had expanded the daily circulation of The Wall Street Journal from 7,000 to 18,750, and over 50,000 by 1930.  He also worked hard to modernize operations by introducing modern printing presses and expanding the reporting corps.

Barron also established the financial advertising agency Doremus & Co. in 1903.  In 1921, he founded the Dow Jones financial journal, Barron's National Financial Weekly, later renamed Barron's Magazine, and served as its first editor.  He priced the magazine at 10 cents an issue and saw circulation explode to 30,000 by 1926, with high popularity among investors and financiers.

Personal life
Barron married Jessie M. Waldron in 1900 and adopted her daughters, Jane and Martha.  Mrs. Barron died in 1918.  After Jane married Hugh Bancroft in 1907, Jane Barron became a prominent member of the Boston Brahmin Bancroft family.  Martha Barron married H. Wendell Endicott, heir apparent to the Endicott Shoe Company. Mr. & Mrs. Barron and the Endicotts are buried in a joint family plot at the historic Forest Hills Cemetery in the Jamaica Plain neighborhood of Boston.

Legacy 
After his death, Barron's responsibilities were split between his son-in-law Hugh Bancroft, who became president of Dow Jones, and his friend Kenneth C. Hogate, who became the managing editor of the Journal.

They Told Barron (1930) and More They Told Barron (1931), two books edited by Arthur Pound and S. T. Moore were published that showed his close connections and his role as a confidant to top financiers from New York City society, such as Charles M. Schwab.  As a result, he has been called "the diarist of the American Dream." (Reutter 148)  This has led to allegations that he was too close to those he covered.

However, Barron was renowned for pushing for deep scrutiny of corporate financial records, and is thus considered the founder of modern financial journalism. Barron's personal credo, which he supposedly urged the Journal to print and follow, was "The Wall Street Journal must stand for what is best in Wall Street." For example, in 1913, he gave testimony to the Massachusetts Public Service Commission regarding a slush fund held by the New Haven Railroad.  In 1920 he investigated Charles Ponzi, inventor of the Ponzi scheme, for The Boston Post.  His aggressive questioning and common-sense reasoning helped lead to Ponzi's arrest and conviction.

The Bancroft family remained the majority shareholder of Dow Jones until July 31, 2007, when Rupert Murdoch's News Corp. won the support of 32 percent of the Dow Jones voting shares controlled by the Bancroft family, enough to ensure a comfortable margin of victory.

Trivia 
He helped endow the Clarke School for the Deaf with two million dollars, and proposed naming it the Coolidge Trust after President Calvin Coolidge and his wife Grace. (Roberts 225)
Clarence W. Barron's former Boston mansion is located at 334 Beacon Street, on the banks of the Charles River.  The property was converted into condominiums in the 1980s. Since 2007 a portrait of Clarence W. Barron has been prominently displayed on the parlor level of the former mansion.

Books 

The Boston Stock Exchange (1893)
The Federal Reserve Act: A discussion of the principles and operations of the new Banking Act as originally published in the Wall Street Journal and the Boston News Bureau, including a description of the financial, commercial and industrial characteristics of each of the Federal Reserve Districts and the Federal Reserve Act fully indexed, with pertinent legislation (1914): a.k.a. "Twenty-Eight Essays on the Federal Reserve Act".
The Audacious War (1915)
 The Mexican Problem (1917)
War Finance, As Viewed From the Roof of the World in Switzerland (1919)
A World Remaking; or, Peace Finance (1920)
Lord's Money (1922)
My Creed (unk.)
They Told Barron (1930)
More They Told Barron (1931)

See also
 William Peter Hamilton

Notes

References 
Roberts, John B.  Rating the First Ladies.  
Reutter, Mark.  Making Steel.

External links 

 
 
Extensive biography, heavily credited
Mention by Pulitzer Prizes
News Luminary: Clarence W. Barron
Columbia Encyclopedia entry

1855 births
1928 deaths
Writers from Boston
Boston Evening Transcript people
The Wall Street Journal people
Burials at Forest Hills Cemetery (Boston)
English High School of Boston alumni
The Boston Post people